The F. W. Woolworth Company (often referred to as Woolworth's or simply Woolworth) was a retail company and one of the pioneers of the five-and-dime store. It was among the most successful American and international five-and-dime businesses, setting trends and creating the modern retail model that stores follow worldwide today.

The first Woolworth store was opened by Frank Winfield Woolworth on February 22, 1879, as "Woolworth's Great Five Cent Store" in Utica, New York. Though it initially appeared to be successful, the store soon failed. When Woolworth searched for a new location, a friend suggested Lancaster, Pennsylvania. Using the sign from the Utica store, Woolworth opened his first successful "Woolworth's Great Five Cent Store" on July 18, 1879, in Lancaster. He brought his brother, Charles Sumner Woolworth, into the business.

The two Woolworth brothers pioneered and developed merchandising, direct purchasing, sales, and customer service practices commonly used today. Despite its growing to be one of the largest retail chains in the world through most of the 20th century, increased competition led to its decline beginning in the 1980s, while its sporting goods division grew. The chain went out of business in July 1997, when the company decided to focus primarily on sporting goods and renamed itself Venator Group. By 2001, the company focused exclusively on the sporting goods market, changing its name to the current Foot Locker, Inc., changing its ticker symbol from its familiar Z in 2003 to its present ticker.

Retail chains using the Woolworth name survived in Austria, Germany, Mexico and the United Kingdom as of early 2009. The similarly named Woolworths supermarkets in Australia and New Zealand are operated by Australia's largest retail company, Woolworths Group, a separate company with no historical links to the F. W. Woolworth Company or Foot Locker, Inc. However, Woolworths Limited did take their name from the original company, as it had not been registered or trademarked in Australia at the time. Similarly, in South Africa, Woolworths Holdings Limited operates a Marks & Spencer-like store and uses the Woolworth name, but has never had any connection with the American company. The property development company Woolworth Group in Cyprus began life as an offshoot of the British Woolworth's company, originally operating Woolworth's department stores in Cyprus. In 2003, these stores were rebranded Debenhams, but the commercial property arm of the business retained the Woolworth's name.

History

Origin 

The F.W. Woolworth Co. had the first five-and-dime stores, which sold discounted general merchandise and fixed price, usually five or ten cents, undercutting the prices of other local merchants. Woolworth, as the stores popularly became known, was one of the first American retailers to put merchandise out for the shopping public to handle and select without the assistance of a sales clerk. Earlier retailers had kept all merchandise behind a counter and customers presented the clerk with a list of items they wished to buy.

After working in Augsbury and Moore dry goods store in Watertown, New York, Frank Winfield Woolworth obtained credit from his former boss, William Moore, along with some savings, to buy merchandise and open the "Woolworth's Great Five Cent Store" in Utica, New York, on February 22, 1879. The store failed and closed in May 1879, after Frank earned enough money to pay back William Moore.  Frank soon made a second attempt, and opened his "Woolworth's Great Five Cent Store", using the same sign, on June 21, 1879, in Lancaster, Pennsylvania.  Lancaster proved a success, and Frank never forgot the city for the rest of his life. Frank wanted to open a second store in Harrisburg, Pennsylvania, and so he asked his brother Charles Sumner "Sum" Woolworth to join him by managing it. The Harrisburg store opened as, "5¢ Woolworth Bro's Store" on July 19, 1879. After a falling-out with the landlord, that store moved to York, Pennsylvania, opening in March 1880. That store did not last long either, closing three months later. Frank searched for a larger, low-rent building. He found an ideal location in Scranton, Pennsylvania, at 125 Penn Avenue, and opened their "5¢ & 10¢ Woolworth Bro's Store" on November 6, 1880, with Sum as manager. The Scranton store is where Sum fully developed the brothers' "5¢ & 10¢" merchandising model. Sum spent a lot of time working the sales floor, talking with customers and employees. He often personally served customers. Sales grew steadily. By 1881, at Frank's suggestion, Sum bought out his brother's share of the Scranton store in two installments, in January 1881 and 1882. This made Sum the first Woolworth Bro's franchisee.

In 1884, confident enough to open another store, Sum partnered with his longtime friend Fred Morgan Kirby to open a store in Wilkes Barre, Pennsylvania, a neighboring town to the west of Scranton. Fred had been working as the head of wholesale operations at Augsbury and Moore of Watertown, New York. Each man put up $600 to launch the Wilkes-Barre store called "Woolworth and Kirby". Fred managed the new store and, while sales were initially poor, the store soon caught on. By 1887 he used his profits to buy out Sum and expand the store under his name; Sum and Fred remained the best of friends. During this time, Frank was expanding with more stores. Sum's approach was different; he worked to perfect the look and feel of his Scranton store. It had mahogany counters with glass dividers and glass-fronted showcases. The store was brightly lit, new, and the wooden floor was polished to a lustrous shine. The layout was soon adopted by Frank for his F. W. Woolworth stores and became the standard as the two brothers persuaded family members and former co-workers from Moore's to join them in forming a "friendly rival syndicate" of five-and-ten-cent stores. Each of the syndicate chain's stores looked similar inside and out, but operated under its founder's name. Frank Woolworth provided much of the merchandise, encouraging the rivals to club together to maximize their inventory and purchasing power.

At the same time, using his preference to have someone he could trust, Frank brought in their cousin, Seymour H. Knox I, to open a store in Reading, Pennsylvania, under the name "Woolworth and Knox". Seymour had been managing a general store in Michigan.

Rise and expansion 
By 1904, there were six chains of affiliated stores operating in the United States and Canada. Between 1905 and 1908, members of the Woolworth Syndicate followed Frank's lead to incorporate their businesses; Sum maintained that he did not need to incorporate his stores. In 1912, the syndicate agreed to a scheme crafted by Frank Woolworth: to join forces and incorporate as one corporate entity under the name "F. W. Woolworth Company" in a merger of all 596 stores. The stock flotation raised over $30 million for the five founders of the merged chains. They all swallowed their pride and accepted Frank's name above the door, with Frank as president of the new corporation. Sum Woolworth, Fred Kirby, Seymour Knox, Earle Charlton, and William Moore each became a director and vice-president. One of the "friendly rival" predecessor chains included several stores initially opened as Woolworth & Knox stores starting as early as September 20, 1884 as well as S. H. Knox & Co. 5 & 10 Cent Stores opened after an 1889 buyout by his cousin, Seymour H. Knox I.  Knox's chain grew to 98 U.S. and 13 Canadian stores by the time of the corporate consolidation. Fred M. Kirby added 96 stores, Earle Charlton added 35, Charles Sumner Woolworth added 15, and William Moore added two. The first Woolworth's store with a Black Store Front sign, appeared in Pembroke, Ontario, Canada.

Sum Woolworth continued to maintain his home base in Scranton. He was not the type to get embroiled in the politics, as executives of the different chains sought to establish themselves in the merger. As he did from the beginning, Sum concentrated on improving stores, particularly in his native Pennsylvania, and training up-and-coming managers. Those managers eventually dispersed across the entire company, setting the style and tone of Woolworth stores worldwide.

In 1900, Frank launched his first development plan in the city of his first success, Lancaster, Pennsylvania. Rather than just enlarging his store on North Queen Street, he bought up properties along the street in an area which was not considered a "good" side of town. By keeping his plans quiet, Frank saw to it that real estate prices would not be inflated in that area. When he finished the real estate purchases, he announced his plan to build a building with five floors of offices above a large store.  The roof had a garden and an open-air theater. The theater was a huge hit in town, and soon became the city's social center. This project was something of a dress rehearsal for his next venture.

In 1910, Frank Woolworth commissioned the design and construction of the Woolworth Building in New York City. A pioneering early skyscraper, it was designed by American architect Cass Gilbert, a graduate of the MIT architecture school. The building was  paid for entirely in cash. It was completed in 1913 and was the tallest building in the world until 1930. It also served as the company’s headquarters until the F.W. Woolworth Company’s successor, the Venator Group (now Foot Locker), sold it in 1998.

Frank Woolworth, president of F. W. Woolworth, Corporation, died in 1919, in Glen Cove, New York.  Sum's demeanor made him the perfect candidate to head the F. W. Woolworth Corporation after the death of his brother. He was non-confrontational, as everyone else positioned themselves in the company. The board of directors unanimously asked Sum to take on the presidency. With his infamous modesty he declined. He did, however, agree to take the new role of chairman. Company treasurer, Hubert Parson, took the presidency. Over the following 25 years, Sum saw four presidents come and go. He gave each one quiet-spoken advice and good counsel. As chairman, he facilitated debate and ensured issues were properly confronted and argued out by the board.

In 1925 the company reported $253 million in sales, in 1926 $239 million.

For many years the company did a strictly "five-and-ten cent" business, but in the spring of 1932 it added a 20-cent line of merchandise. On November 13, 1935, the company's directors decided to discontinue selling-price limits altogether.

The stores eventually incorporated lunch counters after the success of the counters in the first store in the UK in Liverpool that served as general gathering places, a precursor to the modern shopping mall food court. A Woolworth’s lunch counter in Greensboro, North Carolina became the setting for the 1960 Greensboro sit-ins during the Civil Rights Movement.

The Woolworth's concept was widely copied, and five-and-ten-cent stores (also known as five-and-dime stores or dimestores) became a 20th-century fixture in American downtowns. They would serve as anchors for suburban shopping plazas and shopping malls in the 1950s, 1960s, and 1970s. Criticisms that five-and-dime stores drove local merchants out of business would repeat themselves in the early 21st century, when big-box discount stores became popular.

Diversification 

In the 1960s, the five-and-dime concept evolved into the larger discount department store format. In 1962, Woolworth's founded a chain of large, single-floor discount stores called Woolco. Some of these stores were branded as Winfields, after the founder's middle name.

In that same year, Woolworth's competitors opened similar retail chains that sold merchandise at a discount: the S.S. Kresge Company opened Kmart, Dayton's opened Target, and Sam Walton opened his first Wal-Mart store.

The following year, in 1963, Woolworth expanded into the shoe store business with the purchase of Kinney Shoe Corporation, which eventually created the store that Woolworth would become — Foot Locker.

By Woolworth’s 100th anniversary in 1979, it had become the largest department store chain in the world, according to the Guinness Book of World Records.

During the 1980s, the company began expansion into many different specialty store formats, including Afterthoughts (which sold jewelry and other accessories for women), Northern Reflections (which sold cold-weather outerwear), Rx Place (later sold to Phar-Mor), and Champs Sports. By 1989, the company was pursuing an aggressive strategy of multiple specialty store formats targeted at enclosed shopping malls. The idea was that if a particular concept failed at a given mall, the company could quickly replace it with a different concept. The company aimed for ten stores in each of the country's major shopping malls, but this never came to pass as Woolworth never developed that many successful specialty store formats. Also attempted was a revision of the classic Woolworth store model into Woolworth Express, a small, mall-oriented variant which was dubbed "a specialty variety store'', stocked with everyday convenience items such as health and beauty aids, greeting cards, snack foods, cleaning supplies and school supplies (somewhat like the non-pharmacy, mall-based locations of CVS/pharmacy and other drug store chains).

Decline 

The growth and expansion of the company contributed to its downfall. The Woolworth company moved away from its five-and-dime roots and placed less emphasis on its department store chain as it focused on its specialty stores. Still, the company was unable to compete with other chains that had eroded its market share. While it was a success in Canada, the Woolco chain closed in the United States in 1983. Europe's largest F. W. Woolworth store, in Manchester, England (one of two in the city centre), suffered a fire in May 1979. Despite the store being rebuilt even larger and up to the latest fire codes, the negative stories in the press and loss of lives in the fire sealed its fate; it finally closed in 1986. During the rebuilding and partly as a result of the bad press, the British operation was separated from the parent company as Woolworths plc. This proved fortuitous, as the brand subsequently lasted a full twelve years longer in the United Kingdom than it did in the United States. On October 15, 1993, Woolworth's embarked on a restructuring plan that included closing half of its 800-plus general merchandise stores in the United States and converting its Canadian stores to a closeout division named The Bargain! Shop. Woolco and Woolworth survived in Canada until 1994, when the company sold the majority of the Woolco stores to Wal-Mart. The Woolco stores that  Wal-Mart did not purchase were either converted to The Bargain! Shop, sold to Zellers or closed permanently. Approximately 100 Woolworth stores in Canada were rebranded as The Bargain! Shop, and the remainder closed.

Transition 
Amid the decline of the signature stores, Woolworth began focusing on the sale of athletic goods. On January 30, 1997, the company acquired the mail order catalog athletic retailer Eastbay.

On March 17, 1997, Wal-Mart replaced Woolworth's as a component of the Dow Jones Industrial Average. Analysts at the time cited the lower prices of the large discount stores and the expansion of supermarket grocery stores – which had begun to stock merchandise also sold by five-and-dime stores – as contributors to Woolworth's decline in the late 20th century.

Venator
On July 17, 1997, Woolworth's closed its remaining department stores in the U.S. and changed its corporate name to Venator. In 1999, Venator moved from the Woolworth Building in New York City to offices on 34th Street.

Foot Locker
On October 20, 2001, the company changed names again; taking the name of its top retail performer and became Foot Locker, Inc., which Woolworth started in 1974 under Kinney Shoes. Foot Locker, Inc. is the legal continuation of the original Woolworth; it retains Woolworth's pre-1997 stock price history.

As part of celebrating F. W. Woolworth's centennial on the New York Stock Exchange on June 26, 2012, a news release featured 1912 Woolworth's store and a 2012 Foot Locker store.

Influence on popular culture 

 Woolworth was the pioneer of "five-and-dime"-style retailing.
 In 1880, Woolworth first sold manufactured Christmas tree ornaments, which proved extremely popular.
 In 1929, in Atlantic City, New Jersey, Sam Foster (founder of Foster Grant eyewear) sold sunglasses from his counter in Woolworth’s on the city's famous boardwalk, which became a great hit with the sunbathing public.
 On February 1, 1960, four African-American students from North Carolina Agricultural and Technical State University (NC A&T) started the Greensboro sit-ins at a "whites only" lunch counter in the Greensboro, North Carolina store. (The store is now a museum.)
 On February 27, 1960 in Nashville,Tennessee, an integrated student-led movement from nearby black colleges, including Fisk University, American Baptist College, and Tennessee A&I (now Tennessee State), drew more than 200 protestors to the lunch counters at Woolworth, Kress, McClellan, and Walgreen’s across the street, resulting in national media attention after the students’ nonviolent tactics were met with violent backlash from white citizens. Among the protestors arrested was future US Congressman John Lewis, who participated in the sit-in at the lunch counter at Woolworth. The building functioned as a diner, Woolworth's on Fifth, for several years after the original store's closing and is now being converted into an entertainment theater.
 On May 28, 1963, 14 activists – including Tougaloo College chaplain, Reverend Ed King and professors John Salter Jr. and Lois Chaffee (who were white), and students Pearlena Lewis, Anne Moody (who later published Coming of Age in Mississippi), and Memphis Norman (who were black), and Joan Trumpauer (who was white) – protested Jim Crow segregation via a sit-in at Woolworth's "whites only" lunch counter in Jackson, Mississippi. Bill Minor, then the Mississippi correspondent covering civil rights events for the New Orleans Times-Picayune and who was there that day, says the Jackson Woolworth's sit-in was "the signature event of the protest movement in Jackson. The first one there was with real violence." The following year, the Civil Rights Act of 1964 was passed into law.
 In 1976, David Bowie memorably called his look, "a cross between Nijinsky and Woolworth’s."
 On folk singer Nanci Griffith's 1988 live album, One Fair Summer Evening, the song "Love at the Five and Dime" includes an extended introduction that reminisces about Woolworth stores.
 A memorable scene in the Coen brothers' 2000 film O Brother, Where Art Thou?, set in rural Mississippi in 1937, entails George Clooney's character being physically thrown out of an F.W. Woolworth Co. store and admonished by the manager, "And stay out o' the Woolsworth [sic]!"
  A Woolworth's building still remains (albeit as an antique store) in Bakersfield, California, and includes a still-functioning diner.
 The 2nd season of The Red Green Show featured a character named Murray Woolworth, played by Ed Sahely, who ran a variety store called Murray's Variety, where he always sold useless junk and faulty inventions and devices, enforced a strict "no return-no refunds-no exchange" policy, and was constantly scheming ways to cheat Lodge members out of their money as a result of his shady and unethical business practices.

Greensboro, and other, sit-ins 

On February 1, 1960, four black students sat down at a segregated lunch counter in a Greensboro, North Carolina, Woolworth's store. They were refused service, touching off six months of sit-ins and economic boycotts that became a landmark event in the civil rights movement. In 1993, an eight-foot section of the lunch counter was moved to the Smithsonian Institution and the store site now contains a civil rights museum,
which had its grand opening on Monday, February 1, 2010, the 50th anniversary of the beginning of the sit-ins.

Imitation sit-ins also occurred in other cities where there were segregated lunch counters at Woolworth's. In Roanoke, Virginia on August 27, 1960, two women and a boy "...sat at the lunch counter and ordered a slice of pie, a soda and a sundae, all under the watchful eyes of the biracial committee which had organized the event." The names of the three black customers were not reported at the time, and are now unknown. While the incident was uneventful, other sit-ins were completed, also without incident, at 17 other segregated lunch counters in Roanoke.

There were at least 3 sit-ins in Florida Woolworth's locations; two in March 1960, in Tampa and Sarasota, and in July, 1963 in St. Augustine, Florida.

Presidents 

 Frank Winfield Woolworth (1852–1919) from founding to 1919
 Hubert Templeton Parson 1919 to 1932
 Byron D. Miller 1932 to 1935
 Charles Deyo 1935 to 1946
 Alfred Cornwell 1946 to 1954
 James T. Leftwich 1954 to 1958
 Robert C. Kirkwood 1958 to 1965
 Lester A. Burcham 1965 to 1970
 John S. Roberts 1970 to 1975
 Edward F. Gibbons 1975 to 1978
 W. Robert Harris 1978 to ?
 Robert L. Jennings 1984 to 1987
 Frederick E. Hennig 1987 to 1995
 Jack Adams 1993–1994 (interim CEO for restructuring)
 Roger N. Farah 1994 to 2000. Oversaw company's name change to Venator in 1997.
 Matthew D. Serra 2001 to 2009. Oversaw company's name change to Foot Locker in 2001.
 Kenneth C. Hicks, 2009 to 2014.
 Richard A. Johnson, 2014–2022.
 Mary N. Dillon, 2022-present   

In later years the chairman rather than the president was frequently the chief executive officer. Gibbons (1919–1982) succeeded Burcham (1913–1987) as chairman-CEO in 1978 and died in office, succeeded by vice chairman John W. Lynn (1921–2013) who was succeeded in 1986 by president (since 1983, replacing Richard L. Anderson (d. 2015)) Harold Sells. Farah joined the company as chairman and CEO in December 1994 and Hennig was replaced by Dale W. Hilpert as president in May 1995.  That changed after the company's transition into a sporting goods company.

Non-American retail users of the Woolworth name

Former F.W. Woolworth subsidiaries

Currently in business
 Deutsche Woolworth GmbH & Company OHG (founded in 1927), the German unit of F.W. Woolworth has operated independently since 1998; it owns the rights of the Woolworth trademark in continental Europe.
 Woolworth Mexicana operates a chain of small variety stores in Mexico, sold in December 1997 to Control Dinamico S.A. by Foot Locker Inc and is now a subsidiary of Grupo Comercial Control, S.A. de C.V.

Defunct
 Woolworth Canada was the Canadian  unit of  F.W. Woolworth founded in the 1920s and based in North York, Ontario. In addition to the Woolworth stores, other banners of Woolworth Canada included Woolco, The Bargain! Shop, Kinney, Foot Locker, Northern Reflections, Northern Getaway, Northern Traditions, Silk & Satin and Randy River. The division continued to be called Woolworth Canada even after the last stores under the Woolworth nameplate disappeared from Canada in 1994. Woolworth Canada was eventually renamed Venator Group Canada in 1998 and finally Foot Locker Canada in 2001.
 Woolworths Group plc originally was the British unit of F.W. Woolworth's, but operated independently as a separate company from 1982, running stores in the UK, Isle of Man, Jersey and Guernsey. On November 26, 2008, Woolworth's Group plc announced that they were in too much debt to maintain their outgoing payments. The remaining British Woolworth's stores closed by January 6, 2009, with the loss of almost 30,000 jobs. Shop Direct Group purchased the UK Woolworths and operated it as an online entity until 2015.

Others
 Woolworths Group is the largest retail corporation in Australia, operating a variety of supermarket and other retail chains in Australia and New Zealand. The name "Woolworths" was legally taken to capitalize on the F.W. Woolworth name since they did not do business in Australia, and had not registered the trademark there, but is in no other way connected to the U.S. or U.K. Woolworths.
 Woolworths is an upmarket retail chain in South Africa selling goods of a comparable nature to Marks & Spencer stores in the United Kingdom. The South African company also operates stores in Bahrain, Botswana, Ghana, Kenya, Lesotho, Mauritius, Mozambique, Namibia, Nigeria, Oman, Qatar, Swaziland, Tanzania, Uganda, United Arab Emirates, Zambia, and Zimbabwe.
 Woolworth's on Prince William-Henry Street in Bridgetown, Barbados operates independently, having split from the British branch in 1982. It was established in the 1950s, stocking goods shipped from Britain.

See also 

 List of Woolworth buildings
 F. W. Woolworth Co. v. Contemporary Arts, Inc.

References

Further reading
 Winkler, John K. Five and Ten--The Fabulous Life of F. W. Woolworth (1940)

 
1879 establishments in New York (state)
1997 disestablishments in New York (state)
Companies based in New York City
Defunct companies based in New York (state)
Defunct department stores based in New York City
Defunct discount stores of the United States
Defunct retail companies of Canada
Five and dimes
Former components of the Dow Jones Industrial Average
History of Lancaster, Pennsylvania
Retail companies established in 1879
Retail companies disestablished in 1997